Martin Walter (born October 23, 1983) is a, Czech-born German professional ice hockey defenceman. He is currently an Unrestricted Free Agent. He most recently played for Grizzly Adams Wolfsburg in the Deutsche Eishockey Liga (DEL).

References

External links

1983 births
Living people
German ice hockey defencemen
Hamburg Freezers players
Thomas Sabo Ice Tigers players
Grizzlys Wolfsburg players